Looney Tunes is an American animated comedy short film series produced by Warner Bros. from 1930 to 1969, concurrently with its partner series Merrie Melodies, during the golden age of American animation. The two series introduced a large cast of characters, including Bugs Bunny, Daffy Duck, and Porky Pig. The term Looney Tunes has since been expanded to also refer to the characters themselves.

Looney Tunes and Merrie Melodies were initially produced by Leon Schlesinger and animators Hugh Harman and Rudolph Ising from 1930 to 1933. Schlesinger assumed full production from 1933 until selling his studio to Warner Bros. in 1944. The Looney Tunes title was inspired by that of Walt Disney's Silly Symphonies. The shorts initially showcased musical compositions owned by Warner's music publishing interests through the adventures of such characters as Bosko and Buddy. However, the shorts gained a higher profile upon the debuts of directors Tex Avery, Bob Clampett, and Chuck Jones and voice actor Mel Blanc later in the decade. Porky Pig and Daffy Duck became the featured Looney Tunes characters, while Merrie Melodies featured one-shot cartoons and minor recurring characters.

After Bugs Bunny became popular in the Merrie Melodies shorts of the early 1940s, Looney Tunes moved from black and white to color production, Merrie Melodies having already been in color since 1934. The two series gradually lost their distinctions, and shorts were assigned to each series randomly. From 1942 to 1964, Looney Tunes and Merrie Melodies were the most popular animated shorts in movie theaters.

Looney Tunes has since become a worldwide media franchise, spawning several television series, feature films, comic books, music albums, video games, and amusement park rides. Many of the characters have made and continue to make cameo appearances in television shows, films, and other media. Bugs Bunny, in particular, is regarded as a cultural icon and has a star on the Hollywood Walk of Fame. Many Looney Tunes and Merrie Melodies films are ranked among the greatest animated cartoons of all time, and five of them have won Academy Awards. In 2013, TV Guide counted Looney Tunes as the third greatest television cartoon series of all time, behind The Simpsons and The Flintstones, which also featured the voice talents of Mel Blanc and Bea Benaderet.

History 
Looney Tunes and Merrie Melodies were so named because they were initially developed to showcase tracks from Warner Bros.' extensive music library; the title of the first Looney Tunes short, Sinkin' in the Bathtub (1930), is a pun on Singin' in the Bathtub. Between 1934 and 1943, Merrie Melodies were produced in color and Looney Tunes in black and white. After 1943, both series were produced in color and became virtually indistinguishable, varying only in their opening theme music and titles. Both series made use of the various Warner Bros. characters. By 1937, the theme music for Looney Tunes was "The Merry-Go-Round Broke Down" by Cliff Friend and Dave Franklin, and the theme music for Merrie Melodies was an adaptation of "Merrily We Roll Along" by Charles Tobias, Murray Mencher and Eddie Cantor.

1930–1933: Harman and Ising era 
In 1929, to compete against Walt Disney's Mickey Mouse short cartoons, Warner Bros. became interested in developing a series of animated shorts to promote their music. They had recently acquired Brunswick Records along with four music publishers for US$28 million (equivalent to $ million in ) and were eager to promote this material for the sales of sheet music and phonograph records. Warner made a deal with Leon Schlesinger to produce cartoons for them. Schlesinger hired Rudolf Ising and Hugh Harman to produce the first series of cartoons. Schlesinger was impressed by Harman's and Ising's 1929 pilot cartoon, Bosko, The Talk-Ink Kid. The first Looney Tunes short was Sinkin' in the Bathtub starring Bosko, which was released in 1930.

1933–1936: Leon Schlesinger Productions 
When Harman and Ising left Warner Bros. in 1933 over a budget dispute with Schlesinger, they took with them all the rights of the characters and cartoons they had created. A new character called Buddy became the only star of the Looney Tunes series for a couple of years.

New directors including Tex Avery, Friz Freleng and Bob Clampett were brought in or promoted to work with animators in the Schlesinger studio, with Avery's unit housed in a bungalow the animators dubbed "Termite Terrace." In 1935 they debuted the first major Looney Tunes star, Porky Pig, along with Beans the Cat in the Merrie Melodies cartoon I Haven't Got a Hat directed by Friz Freleng. Beans was the star of the next Porky/Beans cartoon Gold Diggers of '49, but it was Porky who emerged as the star instead of Beans. The ensemble characters of I Haven't Got a Hat, such as Oliver Owl, and twin dogs Ham and Ex, were also given a sampling of shorts, but Beans and Porky proved much more popular. Beans was later phased out when his popularity declined, leaving Porky as the only star of the Schlesinger studio.

1936–1944: More star characters and switch to color 
The debuts of other memorable Looney Tunes stars followed: Daffy Duck in Porky's Duck Hunt (1937), Elmer Fudd in the Merrie Melodies short Elmer's Candid Camera (1940), Bugs Bunny in the Merrie Melodies short A Wild Hare (1940), and Tweety in the Merrie Melodies short A Tale of Two Kitties (1942).

Bugs initially starred in the color Merrie Melodies shorts following the success of 1940's A Wild Hare, and formally joined the Looney Tunes series with the release of Buckaroo Bugs in 1944. Schlesinger began to phase in the production of color Looney Tunes with the 1942 cartoon The Hep Cat. The final black-and-white Looney Tunes short was Puss n' Booty in 1943 directed by Frank Tashlin. The inspiration for the changeover was Warner's decision to re-release only the color cartoons in the Blue Ribbon Classics series of Merrie Melodies. Bugs made a cameo appearance in 1942 in the Avery/Clampett cartoon Crazy Cruise and also at the end of the Frank Tashlin 1943 cartoon Porky Pig's Feat, which marked Bugs' only official appearance in a black-and-white Looney Tunes short. Schlesinger sold his interest in the cartoon studio in 1944 to Warner Bros. and went into retirement; he died five years later.

1944–1964: Golden era 

More popular Looney Tunes characters were created (most of which first appeared in Merrie Melodies cartoons) such as Pepé Le Pew (debuted in 1945's Odor-able Kitty), Sylvester (debuted in 1945's Life with Feathers), Yosemite Sam (debuted in 1945's Hare Trigger), Foghorn Leghorn (debuted in 1946's Walky Talky Hawky), Marvin the Martian (debuted in 1948's Haredevil Hare), Wile E. Coyote and the Road Runner (debuted in 1949's Fast and Furry-ous), Granny (debuted in 1950's Canary Row), Speedy Gonzales (debuted in 1953's Cat Tails for Two), and the Tasmanian Devil (debuted in 1954's Devil May Hare).

1964–1969: Dark era 
During the mid-late 1960s, the shorts were produced by DePatie–Freleng Enterprises (and Format Productions) (1964–1967) and Warner Bros.-Seven Arts (1967–1969) after Warner Bros. shut down their animation studio. The shorts from this era can be identified by their different title sequence, featuring stylized limited animation and graphics on a black background and a new arrangement, by William Lava, of "The Merry-Go-Round Broke Down". The change in the introductory title cards was possibly to reflect the switch in the animation style of the shorts themselves.

In 1967, Warner Bros.-Seven Arts commissioned an animation studio in South Korea to redraw 79 black-and-white Looney Tunes produced from 1935 to 1943 in color to be syndicated to TV stations.

The original Looney Tunes theatrical series ran from 1930's Sinkin' in the Bathtub to 1969's Injun Trouble by Robert McKimson.

1970–1999: Syndication and return to television and film 
The Looney Tunes series' popularity was further strengthened when it began airing on network and syndicated television in the 1950s under various titles and formats. The Looney Tunes shorts were broadcast with edits to remove scenes of violence (particularly suicidal gags and scenes of characters performing dangerous stunts that impressionable viewers could easily imitate), stereotypes, and alcohol consumption.

Production of theatrical animated shorts was dormant from 1969 until 1979 when new shorts were made to introduce Looney Tunes to a new generation of audiences. New shorts have been produced and released sporadically for theaters since then, though usually as promotional tie-ins with various family movies produced by Warner Bros. While many have been released in limited releases theatrically for Academy Award consideration, only a few have gained theatrical releases with movies.

In the 1970s through the early 1990s, several feature-film compilations and television specials were produced, mostly centering on Bugs Bunny and/or Daffy Duck, with a mixture of new and old footage. These releases include The Bugs Bunny/Road Runner Movie (1979), The Looney Looney Looney Bugs Bunny Movie (1981), Bugs Bunny's 3rd Movie: 1001 Rabbit Tales (1982), Daffy Duck's Fantastic Island (1983), and Daffy Duck's Quackbusters (1988).

In 1976, the Looney Tunes characters made their way into the amusement business when they became the mascots for the two Marriott's Great America theme parks (Gurnee and Santa Clara). After the Gurnee park was sold to Six Flags, they also claimed the rights to use the characters at the other Six Flags parks, which they continue to do presently.

In 1988, several Looney Tunes characters appeared in cameo roles in Disney's film, Who Framed Roger Rabbit. The more significant cameos featured Bugs, Daffy, Porky, Tweety, and Yosemite Sam. It is the only time in which Looney Tunes characters have shared screen time with their rivals at Disney (producers of the film)—particularly in the scenes where Bugs and Mickey Mouse are skydiving, and when Daffy and Donald Duck are performing their "Dueling Pianos" sequence.

On July 10, 1989, after a battle with heart problems, Mel Blanc died at the Cedars-Sinai Medical Center of cardiovascular disease. A picture depicting the Looney Tunes characters entitled "Speechless" was released shortly after his death.

Paramount-owned Nickelodeon aired all the unaired cartoons in a show called Looney Tunes on Nickelodeon between 1988 and 1999. In January 1999, it was reported that the cartoons shown on Nickelodeon would move to Cartoon Network in the fall of that year. To date, Looney Tunes on Nickelodeon is the longest-airing animated series on the network that was not a Nicktoon.

In 1996, Space Jam, a live-action animated film, was released to theaters starring Bugs Bunny and basketball player Michael Jordan. Despite a mixed critical reception, the film was a major box-office success, grossing nearly $100 million in the U.S. alone, almost becoming the first non-Disney animated film to achieve that feat. For a two-year period, it was the highest grossing non-Disney animated film ever. The film also introduced the character Lola Bunny, who subsequently became another recurring member of the Looney Tunes cast, usually as a love interest for Bugs.

In 1997, Bugs Bunny was featured on a U.S. 32 cent postage stamp; the first of five Looney Tunes themed stamps to be issued.

The Looney Tunes also achieved success in the area of television during this era, with appearances in several originally produced series, including Taz-Mania (1991, starring Taz) and The Sylvester & Tweety Mysteries (1995, starring Sylvester, Tweety, and Granny). The gang also made frequent cameos in the 1990 spinoff series Tiny Toon Adventures, from executive producer Steven Spielberg, where they played teachers and mentors to a younger generation of cartoon characters (Plucky Duck, Hamton J. Pig, Babs and Buster Bunny, etc.), plus occasional cameos in the later Warner Bros. shows such as Animaniacs (also from Spielberg) and Histeria!.

In 1979, Bugs Bunny's Christmas Carol premiered. After The Chocolate Chase, there would not be another short released for seven years. In 1990, it was made so there would be about one short per year until 1998. In 2003, there would be seven shorts produced. The first short released was The Whizzard of Ow, premiering on Walmart and being on the DVD release of Looney Tunes: Back in Action, which these shorts were made to promote. Until 2004, when all the shorts were included on the Blu-ray release,  only about half of the shorts would be available. In 2010, five computer-animated shorts would be released and directed by Matthew O'Callaghan, who would also direct another short, Flash in the Pain, in 2014.

2000–2014: Network Exploration 
In March 2000, it was revealed that the entire Looney Tunes and Merrie Melodies library would be exclusive to Cartoon Network starting fall of that year. Looney Tunes shorts were still airing on Disney's ABC as part of The Bugs Bunny and Tweety Show at the time, and the decision led to the show's cancellation. This decision would remain in effect for over 20 years, until MeTV began airing the classic Warner Bros. cartoons (along with MGM and Paramount's library) in January 2021. In 2003, another feature film was released, this time in an attempt to recapture the spirit of the original shorts: the live-action/animated Looney Tunes: Back in Action. Although the film was not financially successful, it was met with mixed-to-positive reviews from film critics and has been argued by animation historians and fans as the finest original feature-length appearance of the cartoon characters. In 2006, Warner Home Video released a new and Christmas-themed Looney Tunes direct-to-video film called Bah, Humduck! A Looney Tunes Christmas, a parody of Charles Dickens' A Christmas Carol. Other Looney Tunes TV series made during this time were Baby Looney Tunes (2001–2006), Duck Dodgers (2003-2005) and Loonatics Unleashed (2005–2007).

On October 22, 2007, Looney Tunes and Merrie Melodies cartoons became available for the first time in High-definition via Microsoft's Xbox Live service, including some in Spanish. From February 29 – May 18, 2008, many Looney Tunes artifacts, including original animation cels and concept drawings, were on display at the Butler Institute of American Art in Youngstown, Ohio, just off the campus of Youngstown State University, near where the Warners lived early in life.

At the 2009 Cartoon Network upfront, The Looney Tunes Show was announced. After several delays, the series premiered on May 3, 2011. Produced by Warner Bros. Animation, the series centers on Bugs and Daffy as they leave the woods and move to the suburbs with "colorful neighbors" including Sylvester, Tweety, Granny, Yosemite Sam, etc. The series introduced the character Tina Russo, a duck who becomes Daffy's girlfriend. The show also features 2-minute music videos titled respectfully "Merrie Melodies" (as a tribute to the Looney Tunes sister shorts) which features the characters singing original songs, as well as CGI animated shorts starring Wile E. Coyote and the Road Runner (which were removed after the first season). The series was cancelled after its second season.

Also, Wile E. Coyote and the Road Runner returned to the big screen in a series of 3-D shorts that preceded select Warner Bros. films. There were six in the works that began with the first short, Coyote Falls, that preceded the film Cats & Dogs: The Revenge of Kitty Galore, which was released on July 30, 2010. On September 24, 2010, Fur of Flying preceded the film, Legend of the Guardians: The Owls of Ga'Hoole, and on December 17, 2010, Rabid Rider preceded the film, Yogi Bear. On June 8, 2011, Warner Bros. Animation announced that there will be more Looney Tunes 3-D theatrical shorts; the first titled Daffy's Rhapsody with Daffy Duck and Elmer Fudd, the next being I Tawt I Taw a Puddy Tat with Sylvester, Tweety, and Granny. Daffy's Rhapsody was to precede the film Happy Feet Two, until the studio decided to premiere I Tawt I Taw a Puddy Tat instead. Daffy's Rhapsody instead premiered in 2012, preceding Journey 2: The Mysterious Island. All five shorts were directed by Matthew O'Callaghan.

In 2012, several announcements were made about a Looney Tunes reboot film titled Acme, in development. Former Saturday Night Live cast member Jenny Slate was said to be on board as writer for the new film. Jeffrey Clifford, Harry Potter producer David Heyman, and Dark Shadows writers David Katzenberg and Seth Grahame-Smith were slated to produce the film. On August 27, 2014, writers Ashley Miller and Zack Stentz were hired to script the film, directors Glenn Ficarra and John Requa were in talks to direct the film, while actor Steve Carell was rumored to be starring in a lead role. Despite this, the film has yet to enter production.

2015–present: Revival 
At the 2014 Cartoon Network upfront, another series titled Wabbit: A Looney Tunes Production (later New Looney Tunes) was announced. Starring Bugs Bunny, the series premiered on both Cartoon Network and its sister channel Boomerang in late 2015. The series had an unusually slow rollout, with the series being moved to the Boomerang streaming service in 2017, and was eventually cancelled on January 30, 2020.

On June 11, 2018, another series, titled Looney Tunes Cartoons, was announced by Warner Bros. Animation. It premiered on May 27, 2020, on the streaming service HBO Max. The series features "1,000 minutes of new one-to-six minute cartoons featuring the brand's marquee characters", voiced by their current voice actors in "simple, gag-driven and visually vibrant stories" that are rendered by multiple artists employing "a visual style that will resonate with fans", most noticeably having a style reminiscent of the styles of Tex Avery, Bob Clampett, Chuck Jones, Friz Freleng and Robert McKimson. According to co-executive producer Peter Browngardt, "We're not doing guns, but we can do cartoony violence — TNT, the Acme stuff. All that was kind of grandfathered in." Sam Register, president of Warner Bros. Animation also serves as co-executive producers for the series. However guns were implanted in Season 2.

On February 11, 2021, it was announced two new series are in the works: Bugs Bunny Builders and Tweety Mysteries. Bugs Bunny Builders began airing on Cartoon Network as part of Cartoonito and HBO Max on July 25, 2022; Tweety Mysteries will also air on Cartoon Network. Bugs Bunny Builders is aimed towards preschoolers; while Tweety Mysteries is a live-action/animated hybrid.

A sequel to Space Jam titled Space Jam: A New Legacy, starring basketball player LeBron James, was released on theaters and HBO Max on July 16, 2021, after a Los Angeles special screening on July 12, 2021. It is a film with a story of LeBron James' second son, Dom, who gets kidnapped by an evil AI named Al. G Rhythm (Don Cheadle), into the Warner Bros. server-verse. LeBron then assembles the Tune Squad to play against the algorithm and get his son back. It received generally negative reviews and underperformed at the box office.

Home media 
In the 1980s, the shorts received VHS releases, with the pre-August 1948 shorts released by MGM/UA Home Video and the post-July 1948 shorts released by Warner Home Video. In 2003, Warner Home Video began releasing select shorts on DVD, aimed at collectors, in four-disc sets known as the Looney Tunes Golden Collection starting with Volume 1. This continued until 2008, when the final volume of the Golden Collection was released. Then in 2010 until 2013, the company released the Looney Tunes Super Stars DVDs. There have been numerous complaints regarding the Super Stars releases however, particularly the first two, having the post-1953 shorts in a 16:9 widescreen format. The last DVD in the Super Stars series was Sylvester and Hippety Hopper: Marsupial Mayhem, released on April 23, 2013. 2010 and 2011 saw the releases of The Essential Bugs Bunny and The Essential Daffy Duck DVDs. In 2011, the shorts were released on Blu-ray Disc for the first time with the Looney Tunes Platinum Collection series. On September 19, 2017, Warner Home Video's Warner Archive Collection released the five-disc Porky Pig 101 DVD-set.

Licensing and ownership 
In 1933, Harman and Ising left, taking the rights to the Bosko characters with them. However, Warner Bros. retained the rights to the cartoons and the Looney Tunes and Merrie Melodies brand names, leaving their former producer Leon Schlesinger to start his own animation studio to continue the Looney Tunes series. With their retained Bosko rights, Harman and Ising began making cartoons at Metro-Goldwyn-Mayer in 1934 until they were fired in 1937 due to a lack of success. MGM proceeded to form their own studio to create its own cartoons. Time Warner eventually acquired the Bosko characters from Harman and Ising's estates. Meanwhile, the Schlesinger studio continued to make popular cartoons until 1944 when Schlesinger sold his studio to Warner Bros. Since then, Warner Bros. has owned all rights to all post-1933 characters created by Leon Schlesinger Productions and Warner Bros. Cartoons. The rights to individual cartoons however are in other hands.

In 1955, Warner Bros. sold the television distribution rights to 191 of its cartoons (which included the black-and-white Looney Tunes and the black-and-white Merrie Melodies made after Harman and Ising left) to Guild Films. The copyrights to those cartoons were assigned to Sunset Productions, an entity owned by Warner Bros. The cartoons were distributed by Guild Films until it went bankrupt and was bought by Seven Arts. Seven Arts bought WB in 1967, and WB regained the TV distribution rights to the black and white cartoons.

In 1956, Associated Artists Productions (a.a.p.) acquired television distribution rights to most of Warner Bros' pre-1950 library, including all Merrie Melodies (except for those sold to Guild and Lady, Play Your Mandolin!) and color Looney Tunes shorts that were released prior to August 1948, while Warner still owned the copyright to all of the cartoons. Unlike the previous TV package, this package had the Warner titles kept intact and an "Associated Artists Productions presents" title inserted at the head of each reel (as a result, each Merrie Melodies cartoon had the song "Merrily We Roll Along" playing twice). Two years later, United Artists bought a.a.p. (which had also bought Paramount's Popeye films) who merged the company into its television division, United Artists Television. In 1981, UA was sold to MGM, and five years later, Ted Turner acquired the pre-May 1986 MGM library, as well the rights to the a.a.p. library. In 1996, Turner's company, Turner Broadcasting System (whose Turner Entertainment division oversaw the film library), was purchased by Time Warner (now Warner Bros. Discovery) who also owned Warner Bros. Today, Warner Bros. Home Entertainment holds the video rights to the entire Looney Tunes/Merrie Melodies animated output by virtue of Warner Bros.' ownership of Turner Entertainment. Turner's rights to some Looney Tunes cartoons was a motivation for the purchase.

Starting in 1960, the cartoons were repackaged into several different TV programs that remained popular for several decades before being purchased by Turner Broadcasting System. Turner's Cartoon Network reran the cartoons from its launch in 1992 until 2004, and again from 2009 until 2017. The Looney Tunes Show (not to be confused with the 2010s animated series of the same name), an early 2000s anthology produced by Warner Bros. Animation for the network, was broadcast from 2001 to 2004. The show featured shorts from the original Looney Tunes and Merrie Melodies theatrical series. As of 2021, classic cartoons continue to air on Cartoon Network's sister channel, Boomerang and MeTV. Differing curated collections of Looney Tunes and Merrie Melodies are available for streaming on both the Boomerang streaming service and HBO Max.

Five dozen Looney Tunes and Merrie Melodies shorts from before December 1943 have lapsed into the public domain and are thus freely distributed through various unofficial releases.

Filmography

Characters

Racial stereotypes and censorship controversies
Due to content considered offensive, stereotyped or insensitive, in 1968 Warner Bros. removed the "Censored Eleven" episodes of Looney Tunes and Merrie Melodies cartoons from broadcast or distribution. Depictions included those of African Americans (as in Coal Black and de Sebben Dwarfs and Jungle Jitters), Native Americans, Asian Americans, (especially during WWII, as in Tokio Jokio and Bugs Bunny Nips the Nips), Germans, Italians, White Southerners, and Mexicans.

In 1999, Cartoon Network ceased broadcast of all Speedy Gonzales segments, due to concerns about stereotyping of Mexicans. Many Hispanics protested that they were not offended, and expressed fondness for the Speedy Gonzales cartoons. These shorts were made available for Cartoon Network broadcast again in 2002.

Many Warner Bros. cartoons contain fleeting or sometimes extended gags that make reference to racial or ethnic stereotypes, or use ethnic humor. The release of the Looney Tunes Golden Collection: Volume 3 includes a disclaimer at the beginning of each DVD in the volume given by Whoopi Goldberg. She explains that the cartoons are products of their time and contain racial and ethnic stereotypes that "were wrong then and they are wrong today", but the cartoons are presented on the DVD uncut and uncensored because "editing them would be the same as denying that the stereotypes existed." A similarly phrased written disclaimer is shown at the beginning of each DVD in the Looney Tunes Golden Collection: Volume 4, Volume 5, and Volume 6 sets, as well as the Daffy Duck and Foghorn Leghorn Looney Tunes Super Stars sets and the Warner Bros. Home Entertainment Academy Awards Animation Collection.

Accolades

Inducted into the National Film Registry 
 Porky in Wackyland (1938), selected in 2000
 Duck Amuck (1953), selected in 1999
 One Froggy Evening (1955), selected in 2003
 What's Opera, Doc? (1957), selected in 1992

Academy Awards for Best Short Subject (Cartoon) 
 Tweetie Pie (1947) (MM)
 For Scent-imental Reasons (1949) (LT)
 Speedy Gonzales (1955) (MM)
 Birds Anonymous (1957) (MM)
 Knighty Knight Bugs (1958) (LT)

Academy Award nominations 
 Swooner Crooner (1944)
 Walky Talky Hawky (1946)
 Mouse Wreckers (1949)
 From A to Z-Z-Z-Z (1954)
 Sandy Claws (1955)
 Tabasco Road (1957)
 Mexicali Shmoes (1959)
 Mouse and Garden (1960)
 High Note (1960)
 The Pied Piper of Guadalupe (1961)
 Now Hear This (1963)

Related media

Television series 

Series marked with * are compilations of earlier shorts.
 The Bugs Bunny Show (1960–2000)*
 The Porky Pig Show (1964–1967)*
 The Road Runner Show (1966–1973)*
 The Merrie Melodies Show (1972)*
 Merrie Melodies Starring Bugs Bunny & Friends (1990–1994)*
 Tiny Toon Adventures (1990–1992)
 Taz-Mania (1991–1995)
 The Plucky Duck Show (1992)
 Animaniacs  (1993-1998)
 The Sylvester & Tweety Mysteries (1995–2000)
 Bugs 'n' Daffy (1995–1998)*
 Pinky, Elmyra & the Brain (1998–1999)
 Baby Looney Tunes (2001–2006)
 Duck Dodgers (2003–2005)
 Loonatics Unleashed (2005–2007)
 The Looney Tunes Show (2011–2013)
 New Looney Tunes (2015–2020)
 Looney Tunes Cartoons (2020–present)
 Animaniacs (2020 TV series)  (2020–2023)
 Bugs Bunny Builders (2022–present)
 Tooned Out (TBA)
 Tiny Toons Looniversity (2023)
 Tweety Mysteries (TBA)

Television specials
 Daffy Duck and Porky Pig Meet the Groovie Goolies (1972)
 Bugs and Daffy's Carnival of the Animals (1976)
 Bugs Bunny's Easter Special (1977)*
 Bugs Bunny's Howl-oween Special (1977)*
 Bugs Bunny's Thanksgiving Diet (1979)*
 Bugs Bunny's Looney Christmas Tales (1979)
 Bugs Bunny's Bustin' Out All Over (1980)
 The Bugs Bunny Mystery Special (1980)*
 Bugs vs. Daffy: Battle of the Music Video Stars (1988)*
 Cartoon All-Stars to the Rescue (1990)
 Bugs Bunny's Overtures to Disaster (1991)*

Films

Compilation films
 The Bugs Bunny/Road Runner Movie (1979)
 The Looney Looney Looney Bugs Bunny Movie (1981)
 Bugs Bunny's 3rd Movie: 1001 Rabbit Tales (1982)
 Daffy Duck's Fantastic Island (1983)
 Daffy Duck's Quackbusters (1988)

Feature films 
 Two Guys from Texas (1948) (cameo of Bugs Bunny only)
 My Dream Is Yours (1949) (cameos of Bugs Bunny and Tweety Bird only)
 Who Framed Roger Rabbit (1988) (cameos only)
 Gremlins 2: The New Batch (1990) (cameos of Bugs Bunny and Daffy Duck only)
 Space Jam (1996)
 Looney Tunes: Back in Action (2003)
 Space Jam: A New Legacy (2021)
 Coyote vs. Acme (TBA)

Direct-to-video 
 Tiny Toon Adventures: How I Spent My Vacation (1992)
 Tweety's High-Flying Adventure (2000)
 Baby Looney Tunes' Eggs-traordinary Adventure (2003)
 Bah, Humduck! A Looney Tunes Christmas (2006)
 Looney Tunes: Rabbits Run (2015)
 Teen Titans Go! See Space Jam (2021) (the Nerdlucks and archive footage only)
 King Tweety (2022)

Comic books

Dell Publishing (1941–1962) 
 Looney Tunes and Merrie Melodies Comics #1–165 (Dell Publishing, 1941–1955)
 Bugs Bunny #1–85 (Dell Publishing, 1942–1962)
 Porky Pig #1–81 (Dell Publishing, 1942–1962)
 Tweety and Sylvester #1–37 (Dell Publishing, 1952–1962)
 Daffy Duck #1–30 (Dell Publishing, 1953–1962)
 Looney Tunes #166–246 (Dell Publishing, 1955–1962)
 Beep Beep The Road Runner #1–14 (Dell Publishing, 1958–1962)

Gold Key Comics/Whitman (1962–1984) 
 Bugs Bunny #86–245 (Gold Key Comics/Whitman, 1962–1984)
 Daffy Duck #31–145 (Gold Key Comics/Whitman, 1962–1984)
 Tweety and Sylvester #1–120 (Gold Key Comics/Whitman, 1963–1984)
 Porky Pig #1–109 (Gold Key Comics/Whitman, 1965–1984)
 Yosemite Sam and Bugs Bunny #1–80 (Gold Key Comics/Whitman, 1970–1983)
 Beep Beep The Road Runner #1–105 (Gold Key Comics/Whitman, 1971–1984)
 Looney Tunes #1–47 (Gold Key Comics/Whitman, 1975–1984)

DC Comics (1990–present) 
 Bugs Bunny #1–3 (DC Comics, 1990); #1–3 (DC Comics, 1993)
 Looney Tunes #1–present (DC Comics, 1994–present)

Plus various one-shots, specials and appearances in anthology comics like March of Comics, Top Comics and Dell Giant from various Western Publishing imprints. The numbering of the Dell issues generally includes 3-4 appearances in Dell's Four Color comics.

Video games 

Video games based on Looney Tunes characters began in 1979 with the Road Runner pinball machine. More titles would continue to be released as video game hardware evolved throughout the 1980s, 1990s, 2000s, and 2010s. Prominent characters who have received multiple video games include Bugs Bunny, Daffy Duck, the Tasmanian Devil, Wile E. Coyote and the Road Runner, Speedy Gonzales, and Sylvester and Tweety.

See also 

 Merrie Melodies, another series of animated cartoons also produced by Warner Bros. between 1931 and 1969
 Silly Symphony, a series of animated shorts produced by Walt Disney Productions between 1929 and 1939
 Happy Harmonies, a series of animated shorts distributed by MGM between 1934 and 1938
 Warner Bros. Cartoons
 List of Warner Bros. cartoons with Blue Ribbon reissues

References

External links 

 Looney Tunes Official website
 WB LT Filmography
 

Animated film series
Censored films
DC Comics titles
Film series introduced in 1930
Looney Tunes
Mass media franchises introduced in 1930
Short film series
Slapstick films
Surreal comedy films
Television censorship
Warner Bros. Cartoons
Warner Bros. franchises